Cindy Burger and Laura Pous Tió were the defending champions, but both players chose not to participate.

Anastasiya Komardina and Elitsa Kostova won the title, defeating Manon Arcangioli and Sara Cakarevic in the final, 6–3, 6–4.

Seeds

Draw

References
Main Draw

Grand Est Open 88 - Doubles